WYXE (1130 AM, "Radio Vida 1130") is a religious radio station broadcasting in Spanish from Gallatin, Tennessee. It operates only during daytime hours. It is owned by Iglesia de Dios Hispana de Nashville.

External links
 WYXE official website

YXE
YXE
YXE
Radio stations established in 1990
YXE